Connor Brown (born January 14, 1994) is a Canadian professional ice hockey right winger for the Washington Capitals of the National Hockey League (NHL). Brown was selected by the Toronto Maple Leafs in the sixth round, 156th overall, of the 2012 NHL Entry Draft. Brown played for the Erie Otters in the Ontario Hockey League (OHL) from 2011 until 2014, then for the American Hockey League (AHL)'s Toronto Marlies for the better part of two seasons before joining the Toronto Maple Leafs full-time in the 2016–17 season. He played for two more years with Toronto before he was traded to the Ottawa Senators in 2019. Brown spent three seasons with the Senators where he was an alternate captain. He was traded to the Washington Capitals heading into the 2022–23 NHL season.

Playing career

Amateur
Brown grew up playing youth hockey in the Toronto area. He played first for the West Mall Lightning mite select team, in the North York Hockey League, where his father was the head coach. The Lightning team later morphed in the GTHL Toronto Marlboros team for players born in 1994. The core of the team won ten-straight city championships and included seven players who would go on to be selected at the 2012 NHL Entry Draft: Brown, Scott Laughton, Matt Finn, Adam Pelech, Scott Kosmachuk, Jake Paterson and Matia Marcantuoni.

Brown was selected in the 13th round, 251st overall, by the Ontario Hockey League (OHL)'s Erie Otters in the 2010 OHL Priority Draft. He spent the 2010–11 season playing Junior "A" hockey for the St. Michael's Buzzers in the Ontario Junior Hockey League (OJHL).

Brown joined the Otters for the 2011–12 season and led the team in points (53), goals (25) and assists (28), and was named to the OHL's All-Rookie Team. However, he recorded a plus-minus of –72, a jarring statistic that was also the worst plus-minus of any player in the OHL (second-worst was teammate Kris Grant with –61). The plus-minus was primarily a result of an Otters team that finished last in the OHL, resulting in the franchise drafting first overall in the OHL draft and selecting future NHL star Connor McDavid. Brown entered the 2012 NHL Entry Draft and was selected in the sixth round, 156th overall, by his hometown Toronto Maple Leafs. Brown's offensive talent lead the Maple Leafs to select him, but his small stature and historically bad plus-minus caused the pick to be called a "gamble".

Brown returned to the Otters for the 2012–13 season, serving as the captain of the team.

Brown spent the 2013–14 season on a line with Connor McDavid, scoring 45 goals and 83 assists for 128 points in 68 games. He went on to score 8 goals and 10 assists in 14 games during the playoffs to cap off what was the best season in the team's history. Brown was awarded both the Jim Mahon Memorial Trophy as the OHL's top scoring right winger, and the Eddie Powers Memorial Trophy as the top scoring player in the OHL. At the time of his departure, he held the Otters franchise record for most points in a single season; his record has since been passed by former line-mate Dylan Strome, who surpassed it by one point the following season.

Professional

Toronto Maple Leafs
On November 22, 2013, Brown signed a three-year, entry-level contract with the Maple Leafs. In his first year with the Maple Leafs' American Hockey League (AHL) affiliate, the Toronto Marlies, he won the AHL rookie scoring title, finishing the regular season with 21 goals and 40 assists. Brown played for the Marlies until his call-up to the Maple Leafs in March 2016.

Brown almost made the Maple Leafs' NHL roster out of training camp for the 2015–16 season, but was assigned to the AHL to further his development. However, he would be called up to the team late in the season as part of an initiative by the team to give AHL rookies some late season experience. Brown made his NHL debut on March 17, 2016, against the Florida Panthers, and scored his first NHL goal on March 24 against future teammate Frederik Andersen of the Anaheim Ducks.

Brown made the Maple Leafs full-time for the 2016–17 season. However, a deep presence of forward depth meant Brown was playing on the fourth line with Matt Martin, though he saw time on the penalty kill. After five games in a limited role, Maple Leafs veteran forward Milan Michálek was placed on waivers in order to make room and give Brown a larger role on the team. Former Maple Leaf Ben Smith rejoined the team via waivers in order to take Brown's former spot. Brown played the rest of the year mostly on a line with Nazem Kadri and Leo Komarov, collecting 20 goals and compiling 36 points.

On August 26, 2017, as a restricted free agent, Brown signed a new three-year, $6.3 million contract with Toronto worth $2.1 million annually. During the  season, Brown scored 8 goals and 29 points in 82 games.

Ottawa Senators
On July 1, 2019, Brown was traded (along with Nikita Zaitsev and Michael Carcone) to the Ottawa Senators in exchange for Cody Ceci, Ben Harpur, Aaron Luchuk and a third-round pick in the 2020 NHL Entry Draft. In Ottawa, Brown saw an expanded role after falling down the depth chart in Toronto. He made his debut for the Senators on opening day of the  season versus Toronto. He finished the season second on the team in scoring, with 16 goals and 43 points.

On October 22, 2020, Brown re-signed as a restricted free agent with the Ottawa Senators, for three years at an average annual value of $3.6 million. During the  season, Brown set the Senators franchise record for consecutive games with a goal with seven, set on April 10, 2021. On April 20, 2021, Brown scored two goals in a 4–2 win over the Calgary Flames. He finished the season with 21 goals in 56 games. During the  season, Brown scored only 10 goals and 39 points in 64 games.

Washington Capitals
Following his third season with the Senators, Brown was traded on the opening day of free agency on July 13, 2022, to the Washington Capitals in exchange for a second-round draft pick in 2024. After only playing four games with the Capitals in the  season, Brown suffered an anterior cruciate ligament injury which required surgery. Capitals coach Peter Laviolette announced Brown would likely miss the rest of the year.

Personal life
Brown became engaged to his long-time girlfriend in January 2020. They married in August 2021.

Career statistics

Regular season and playoffs

International

Awards and honours

References

External links 
 

1994 births
Living people
Canadian expatriate ice hockey players in the United States
Canadian ice hockey right wingers
Erie Otters players
Ontario Junior Hockey League players
Ottawa Senators players
Sportspeople from Etobicoke
Ice hockey people from Toronto
Toronto Maple Leafs draft picks
Toronto Maple Leafs players
Toronto Marlies players
Washington Capitals players